MPA Nadeem Siddiqui is a Pakistani politician. He served as CPLC deputy chief Hyderabad. He was also vice president of the  chamber of commerce and chairman of the Hyderabad law and order committee.

Political career

He was elected to the Provincial Assembly of Sindh as a candidate of Muttahida Qaumi Movement from Constituency PS-65 (Hyderabad-IV) in 2018 Pakistani general election.

References

Living people
Muttahida Qaumi Movement MPAs (Sindh)
Year of birth missing (living people)